KCMC (740 AM) is a radio station licensed to Texarkana, Texas, United States. It serves the Texarkana area. The station is currently owned by Texarkana Radio Center. Studios are located on Olive Street, just west of the border with Arkansas, and the transmitter is on De Loach Street in the Texarkana city limits also west of the Arkansas border.

History
The station was founded in 1933 by Clyde E. Palmer as a sister outlet to his Texarkana Gazette. It was Texarkana's first radio station. By approval of the Federal Communications Commission, station WDIX, Tupelo, Mississippi, was shut down, and operation of KCMC in Texarkana, Arkansas, was authorized. KCMC operated on 1420 kHz with 100 Watts of power.

The station is an affiliate of the Dallas Cowboys radio network.

Disk jockey Barney Cannon (1955-2009), an authority on Country music who spent a quarter century with KWKH in Shreveport, once worked at KCMC.

On January 15, 2015, the then-KTFS changed formats to talk, branded as "Talk Radio 740".

On July 1, 2017, KTFS went silent. On November 28, 2017, KTFS's callsign was changed back to KCMC.  A news release on the KTOY website said that KCMC could return to the air from a new facility at some time in the future.

On January 22, 2019, KCMC returned to the air with conservative talk, simulcasting KTFS-FM 107.1 Texarkana, AR.

In mid-October 2019, KCMC dropped its simulcast with KTFS-FM and changed their format to sports, branded as "107.9 The Fan".

740 AM is a Canadian clear-channel frequency, on which CFZM in Toronto, Ontario is the dominant Class A station.  KCMC must reduce power during nighttime hours in order to protect the nighttime skywave signal of CFZM.

Translator

References

External links

CMC (AM)
Texarkana
Texarkana, Texas
Radio stations established in 1933
1933 establishments in Texas
Sports radio stations in the United States